,
This is a list of golf-simulation video games ordered by release year.

Franchises 
 Actua Golf
 Everybody's Golf (Hot Shots Golf)
 Famicom Golf (Golf)
 Jack Nicklaus
 Links
 Mario Golf
 PGA Tour (Tiger Woods PGA Tour)
 Wii (golf minigames)

Games

See also
Sports game

References

External links
List of Golf video games at uvlist.net

Golf